Nunarijjait (Inuktitut syllabics: ᓄᓇᕆᔾᔭᐃᑦ) formerly Nunajuak Island is one of the uninhabited Canadian arctic islands located in the Hudson Strait, Nunavut, Canada. It is a Baffin Island offshore island in the Qikiqtaaluk Region.

References

Islands of Baffin Island
Islands of Hudson Strait
Uninhabited islands of Qikiqtaaluk Region